The 92nd United States Congress was a meeting of the legislative branch of the United States federal government, composed of the United States Senate and the United States House of Representatives. It met in Washington, D.C., from January 3, 1971, to January 3, 1973, during the third and fourth years of Richard Nixon's presidency.

The apportionment of seats in this House of Representatives was based on the 1960 census. Both chambers maintained a Democratic majority.

Major events

Passing legislation on revenue-sharing was a key event of the congress. President Richard Nixon had it listed on his list of top policies to cover for the year. Nixon signed the bill into law at Independence Hall in Philadelphia.  The law gained support from many state and local officials including: San Francisco Mayor Joseph Alioto whose city received $27 million in revenue-sharing money in the first year. Alito said that many projects that would not have been possible could now be done, "That will effectively enable us to meet those programs which up to now because of very tough budgeting we've had to trench."

Major legislation

 December 18, 1971: Alaska Native Claims Settlement Act, 
 December 23, 1971: National Cancer Act, 
 February 7, 1972: Federal Election Campaign Act, 
 March 24, 1972: Equal Employment Opportunity Act, 
 June 23, 1972: Title IX Amendment of the Higher Education Act, 
 October 6, 1972: Federal Advisory Committee Act, 
 October 18, 1972: Federal Water Pollution Control Amendments of 1972, 
 October 21, 1972: Marine Mammal Protection Act, 
 October 27, 1972: Consumer Product Safety Act, 
 October 27, 1972: Noise Control Act, 
 October 27, 1972: Coastal Zone Management Act,

Constitutional amendments

 March 23, 1971: Approved an amendment to the United States Constitution prohibiting the states and the federal government from using age as a reason for denying the right to vote to citizens of the United States who are at least eighteen years old, and submitted it to the state legislatures for ratification
 July 1, 1971: The Twenty-sixth Amendment to the United States Constitution was ratified by the requisite number of states (38) to become part of the Constitution
 March 22, 1972: Approved an amendment to the Constitution designed to guarantee equal rights for women, and submitted it to the state legislatures for ratification
 This amendment, commonly known as the Equal Rights Amendment, was later rendered inoperative, as it was not ratified within the seven–year time frame set by Congress (nor the later time extension granted)

Party summary
The count below identifies party affiliations at the beginning of the first session of this Congress, and includes members from vacancies and newly admitted states, when they were first seated. Changes resulting from subsequent replacements are shown below in the Changes in membership section.

Senate

House of Representatives

Leadership

Senate 
 President: Spiro Agnew (R)
 President pro tempore:
 Richard Russell Jr. (D), until January 21, 1971
 Allen J. Ellender (D), January 22, 1971 – July 27, 1972
 James Eastland (D), from July 28, 1972
 Permanent Acting President pro tempore: Lee Metcalf (D)

Majority (Democratic) leadership 
 Majority Leader: Mike Mansfield
 Majority Whip: Robert Byrd
 Caucus Secretary: Frank Moss

Minority (Republican) leadership 
 Minority Leader: Hugh Scott
 Minority Whip: Robert P. Griffin
 Republican Conference Chairman: Margaret Chase Smith
 Republican Conference Secretary: Norris Cotton
 National Senatorial Committee Chair: Peter H. Dominick
 Policy Committee Chairman: Gordon Allott

House of Representatives 
 Speaker: Carl Albert (D)

Majority (Democratic) leadership 
 Majority Leader: Hale Boggs
 Majority Whip: Tip O'Neill
 Democratic Caucus Chairman: Olin E. Teague
 Democratic Caucus Secretary: Leonor Sullivan
 Democratic Campaign Committee Chairman: Tip O'Neill

Minority (Republican) leadership 
 Minority Leader: Gerald Ford
 Minority Whip: Leslie C. Arends
 Republican Conference Chairman: John B. Anderson
 Republican Conference Vice-Chairman: Robert Stafford then Samuel L. Devine
 Republican Conference Secretary: Richard H. Poff then Jack Edwards
 Policy Committee Chairman: John Jacob Rhodes
 Republican Campaign Committee Chairman: Bob Wilson

Caucuses
 Congressional Black Caucus
 House Democratic Caucus
 Senate Democratic Caucus

Members
This list is arranged by chamber, then by state. Senators are listed in order of class, and representatives are listed by district.

Senate
Senators are popularly elected statewide every two years, with one-third beginning new six-year terms with each Congress. Preceding the names in the list below are Senate class numbers, which indicate the cycle of their election. In this Congress, Class 1 meant their term began with this Congress, requiring reelection in 1976; Class 2 meant their term ended with this Congress, requiring reelection in 1972; and Class 3 meant their term began in the last Congress, requiring reelection in 1974.

Alabama 
 2. John Sparkman (D)
 3. James Allen (D)

Alaska 
 2. Ted Stevens (R)
 3. Mike Gravel (D)

Arizona 
 1. Paul Fannin (R)
 3. Barry Goldwater (R)

Arkansas 
 2. John L. McClellan (D)
 3. J. William Fulbright (D)

California 
 1. John V. Tunney (D)
 3. Alan Cranston (D)

Colorado 
 2. Gordon Allott (R)
 3. Peter H. Dominick (R)

Connecticut 
 1. Lowell Weicker (R)
 3. Abraham Ribicoff (D)

Delaware 
 1. William Roth (R)
 2. J. Caleb Boggs (R)

Florida 
 1. Lawton Chiles (D)
 3. Edward Gurney (R)

Georgia 
 2. Richard Russell Jr. (D), until January 21, 1971
 David H. Gambrell (D), February 1, 1971 – November 7, 1972
 Sam Nunn (D), from November 7, 1972
 3. Herman Talmadge (D)

Hawaii 
 1. Hiram Fong (R)
 3. Daniel Inouye (D)

Idaho 
 2. Leonard B. Jordan (R)
 3. Frank Church (D)

Illinois 
 2. Charles H. Percy (R)
 3. Adlai Stevenson III (D)

Indiana 
 1. Vance Hartke (D)
 3. Birch Bayh (D)

Iowa 
 2. Jack Miller (R)
 3. Harold Hughes (D)

Kansas 
 2. James B. Pearson (R)
 3. Bob Dole (R)

Kentucky 
 2. John Sherman Cooper (R)
 3. Marlow Cook (R)

Louisiana 
 2. Allen J. Ellender (D), until July 27, 1972
 Elaine Edwards (D), August 1, 1972 – November 13, 1972
 J. Bennett Johnston (D), from November 14, 1972
 3. Russell B. Long (D)

Maine 
 1. Edmund Muskie (D)
 2. Margaret Chase Smith (R)

Maryland 
 1. J. Glenn Beall Jr. (R)
 3. Charles Mathias (R)

Massachusetts 
 1. Ted Kennedy (D)
 2. Edward Brooke (R)

Michigan 
 1. Philip Hart (D)
 2. Robert P. Griffin (R)

Minnesota 
 1. Hubert Humphrey (DFL)
 2. Walter Mondale (DFL)

Mississippi 
 1. John C. Stennis (D)
 2. James Eastland (D)

Missouri 
 1. Stuart Symington (D)
 3. Thomas Eagleton (D)

Montana 
 1. Mike Mansfield (D)
 2. Lee Metcalf (D)

Nebraska 
 1. Roman Hruska (R)
 2. Carl Curtis (R)

Nevada 
 1. Howard Cannon (D)
 3. Alan Bible (D)

New Hampshire 
 2. Thomas J. McIntyre (D)
 3. Norris Cotton (R)

New Jersey 
 1. Harrison A. Williams (D)
 2. Clifford P. Case (R)

New Mexico 
 1. Joseph Montoya (D)
 2. Clinton Anderson (D)

New York 
 1. James L. Buckley (C)
 3. Jacob Javits (R)

North Carolina 
 2. B. Everett Jordan (D)
 3. Sam Ervin (D)

North Dakota 
 1. Quentin Burdick (D-NPL)
 3. Milton Young (R)

Ohio 
 3. William B. Saxbe (R)
 1. Robert Taft Jr. (R)

Oklahoma 
 2. Fred R. Harris (D)
 3. Henry Bellmon (R)

Oregon 
 2. Mark Hatfield (R)
 3. Bob Packwood (R)

Pennsylvania 
 1. Hugh Scott (R)
 3. Richard Schweiker (R)

Rhode Island 
 1. John Pastore (D)
 2. Claiborne Pell (D)

South Carolina 
 2. Strom Thurmond (R)
 3. Fritz Hollings (D)

South Dakota 
 2. Karl E. Mundt (R)
 3. George McGovern (D)

Tennessee 
 1. Bill Brock (R)
 2. Howard Baker (R)

Texas 
 1. Lloyd Bentsen (D)
 2. John Tower (R)

Utah 
 1. Frank Moss (D)
 3. Wallace F. Bennett (R)

Vermont 
 1. Winston L. Prouty (R), until September 10, 1971
 Robert Stafford (R), from September 16, 1971
 3. George Aiken (R)

Virginia 
 1. Harry F. Byrd Jr. (I)
 2. William B. Spong Jr. (D)

Washington 
 1. Henry M. Jackson (D)
 3. Warren Magnuson (D)

West Virginia 
 1. Robert Byrd (D)
 2. Jennings Randolph (D)

Wisconsin 
 1. William Proxmire (D)
 3. Gaylord Nelson (D)

Wyoming 
 1. Gale W. McGee (D)
 2. Clifford Hansen (R)

House of Representatives
The names of members of the House of Representatives are preceded by their district numbers.

Alabama 
(5–3 Democratic)
 . Jack Edwards (R)
 . William Louis Dickinson (R)
 . George W. Andrews (D), until December 25, 1971
 Elizabeth B. Andrews (D), from April 4, 1972
 . Bill Nichols (D)
 . Walter Flowers (D)
 . John Hall Buchanan Jr. (R)
 . Tom Bevill (D)
 . Robert E. Jones Jr. (D)

Alaska 
(1 Democrat)
 . Nick Begich (D), until October 16, 1972

Arizona 
(2–1 Republican)
 . John Jacob Rhodes (R)
 . Mo Udall (D)
 . Sam Steiger (R)

Arkansas 
(3–1 Democratic)
 . William Vollie Alexander Jr. (D)
 . Wilbur Mills (D)
 . John Paul Hammerschmidt (R)
 . David Pryor (D)

California 
(20–18 Democratic)
 . Donald H. Clausen (R)
 . Harold T. Johnson (D)
 . John E. Moss (D)
 . Robert L. Leggett (D)
 . Phillip Burton (D)
 . William S. Mailliard (R)
 . Ron Dellums (D)
 . George P. Miller (D)
 . Don Edwards (D)
 . Charles Gubser (R)
 . Pete McCloskey (R)
 . Burt Talcott (R)
 . Charles M. Teague (R)
 . Jerome Waldie (D)
 . John J. McFall (D)
 . B. F. Sisk (D)
 . Glenn M. Anderson (D)
 . Bob Mathias (R)
 . Chester E. Holifield (D)
 . H. Allen Smith (R)
 . Augustus Hawkins (D)
 . James C. Corman (D)
 . Del M. Clawson (R)
 . John H. Rousselot (R)
 . Charles E. Wiggins (R)
 . Thomas M. Rees (D)
 . Barry Goldwater Jr. (R)
 . Alphonzo E. Bell Jr. (R)
 . George E. Danielson (D)
 . Edward R. Roybal (D)
 . Charles H. Wilson (D)
 . Craig Hosmer (R)
 . Jerry Pettis (R)
 . Richard T. Hanna (D)
 . John G. Schmitz (R)
 . Bob Wilson (R)
 . Lionel Van Deerlin (D)
 . Victor Veysey (R)

Colorado 
(2–2 split)
 . Mike McKevitt (R)
 . Donald G. Brotzman (R)
 . Frank Evans (D)
 . Wayne N. Aspinall (D)

Connecticut 
(4–2 Democratic)
 . William R. Cotter (D)
 . Robert H. Steele (R)
 . Robert Giaimo (D)
 . Stewart McKinney (R)
 . John S. Monagan (D)
 . Ella Grasso (D)

Delaware 
(1 Republican)
 . Pete du Pont (R)

Florida 
(9–3 Democratic)
 . Bob Sikes (D)
 . Don Fuqua (D)
 . Charles E. Bennett (D)
 . Bill Chappell (D)
 . Louis Frey Jr. (R)
 . Sam Gibbons (D)
 . James A. Haley (D)
 . Bill Young (R)
 . Paul Rogers (D)
 . J. Herbert Burke (R)
 . Claude Pepper (D)
 . Dante Fascell (D)

Georgia 
(8–2 Democratic)
 . George Elliott Hagan (D)
 . Dawson Mathis (D)
 . Jack Brinkley (D)
 . Benjamin B. Blackburn (R)
 . Fletcher Thompson (R)
 . John Flynt (D)
 . John William Davis (D)
 . W. S. Stuckey Jr. (D)
 . Phillip M. Landrum (D)
 . Robert Grier Stephens Jr. (D)

Hawaii 
(2 Democrats)
 . Spark Matsunaga (D)
 . Patsy Mink (D)

Idaho 
(2 Republicans)
 . James A. McClure (R)
 . Orval H. Hansen (R)

Illinois 
(12–12 split)
 . Ralph Metcalfe (D)
 . Abner J. Mikva (D)
 . Morgan F. Murphy (D)
 . Ed Derwinski (R)
 . John C. Kluczynski (D)
 . George W. Collins (D), until December 8, 1972
 . Frank Annunzio (D)
 . Dan Rostenkowski (D)
 . Sidney R. Yates (D)
 . Harold R. Collier (R)
 . Roman Pucinski (D)
 . Robert McClory (R)
 . Phil Crane (R)
 . John N. Erlenborn (R)
 . Charlotte Thompson Reid (R), until October 7, 1971
 Cliffard D. Carlson (R), from April 4, 1972
 . John B. Anderson (R)
 . Leslie C. Arends (R)
 . Robert H. Michel (R)
 . Tom Railsback (R)
 . Paul Findley (R)
 . Kenneth J. Gray (D)
 . William L. Springer (R)
 . George E. Shipley (D)
 . Melvin Price (D)

Indiana 
(6–5 Republican)
 . Ray Madden (D)
 . Earl Landgrebe (R)
 . John Brademas (D)
 . J. Edward Roush (D)
 . Elwood Hillis (R)
 . William G. Bray (R)
 . John T. Myers (R)
 . Roger H. Zion (R)
 . Lee H. Hamilton (D)
 . David W. Dennis (R)
 . Andrew Jacobs Jr. (D)

Iowa 
(5–2 Republican)
 . Fred Schwengel (R)
 . John Culver (D)
 . H. R. Gross (R)
 . John Henry Kyl (R)
 . Neal Edward Smith (D)
 . Wiley Mayne (R)
 . William J. Scherle (R)

Kansas 
(4–1 Republican)
 . Keith Sebelius (R)
 . William R. Roy (D)
 . Larry Winn (R)
 . Garner E. Shriver (R)
 . Joe Skubitz (R)

Kentucky 
(5–2 Democratic)
 . Frank Stubblefield (D)
 . William Natcher (D)
 . Romano Mazzoli (D)
 . Gene Snyder (R)
 . Tim Lee Carter (R)
 . John C. Watts (D), until September 24, 1971
 William P. Curlin Jr. (D), from December 4, 1971
 . Carl D. Perkins (D)

Louisiana 
(8 Democrats)
 . F. Edward Hébert (D)
 . Hale Boggs (D)
 . Patrick T. Caffery (D)
 . Joe Waggonner (D)
 . Otto Passman (D)
 . John Rarick (D)
 . Edwin Edwards (D), until May 9, 1972
 John Breaux (D), from September 30, 1972
 . Speedy Long (D)

Maine 
(2 Democrats)
 . Peter Kyros (D)
 . William Hathaway (D)

Maryland 
(5–3 Democratic)
 . Rogers Morton (R), until January 29, 1971
 William Oswald Mills (R), from May 25, 1971
 . Clarence Long (D)
 . Edward Garmatz (D)
 . Paul Sarbanes (D)
 . Lawrence Hogan (R)
 . Goodloe Byron (D)
 . Parren Mitchell (D)
 . Gilbert Gude (R)

Massachusetts 
(8–4 Democratic)
 . Silvio O. Conte (R)
 . Edward Boland (D)
 . Robert Drinan (D)
 . Harold Donohue (D)
 . F. Bradford Morse (R), until May 1, 1972
 . Michael J. Harrington (D)
 . Torbert Macdonald (D)
 . Tip O'Neill (D)
 . Louise Day Hicks (D)
 . Margaret Heckler (R)
 . James A. Burke (D)
 . Hastings Keith (R)

Michigan 
(12–7 Republican)
 . John Conyers (D)
 . Marvin L. Esch (R)
 . Garry E. Brown (R)
 . J. Edward Hutchinson (R)
 . Gerald Ford (R)
 . Charles E. Chamberlain (R)
 . Donald Riegle (R)
 . R. James Harvey (R)
 . Guy Vander Jagt (R)
 . Elford Albin Cederberg (R)
 . Philip Ruppe (R)
 . James G. O'Hara (D)
 . Charles Diggs (D)
 . Lucien Nedzi (D)
 . William D. Ford (D)
 . John Dingell (D)
 . Martha Griffiths (D)
 . William Broomfield (R)
 . Jack H. McDonald (R)

Minnesota 
(4–4 split)
 . Al Quie (R)
 . Ancher Nelsen (R)
 . Bill Frenzel (R)
 . Joseph Karth (DFL)
 . Donald M. Fraser (DFL)
 . John M. Zwach (R)
 . Robert Bergland (DFL)
 . John Blatnik (DFL)

Mississippi 
(5 Democrats)
 . Thomas Abernethy (D)
 . Jamie Whitten (D)
 . Charles H. Griffin (D)
 . Sonny Montgomery (D)
 . William M. Colmer (D)

Missouri 
(9–1 Democratic)
 . Bill Clay (D)
 . James W. Symington (D)
 . Leonor Sullivan (D)
 . William J. Randall (D)
 . Richard Walker Bolling (D)
 . William Raleigh Hull Jr. (D)
 . Durward Gorham Hall (R)
 . Richard Howard Ichord Jr. (D)
 . William L. Hungate (D)
 . Bill Burlison (D)

Montana 
(1–1 split)
 . Richard G. Shoup (R)
 . John Melcher (D)

Nebraska 
(3 Republicans)
 . Charles Thone (R)
 . John Y. McCollister (R)
 . David Martin (R)

Nevada 
(1 Democrat)
 . Walter S. Baring Jr. (D)

New Hampshire 
(2 Republicans)
 . Louis C. Wyman (R)
 . James Colgate Cleveland (R)

New Jersey 
(9–6 Democratic)
 . John E. Hunt (R)
 . Charles W. Sandman Jr. (R)
 . James J. Howard (D)
 . Frank Thompson (D)
 . Peter Frelinghuysen Jr. (R)
 . Edwin B. Forsythe (R)
 . William B. Widnall (R)
 . Robert A. Roe (D)
 . Henry Helstoski (D)
 . Peter W. Rodino (D)
 . Joseph Minish (D)
 . Florence P. Dwyer (R)
 . Cornelius Gallagher (D)
 . Dominick V. Daniels (D)
 . Edward J. Patten (D)

New Mexico 
(1–1 split)
 . Manuel Lujan Jr. (R)
 . Harold L. Runnels (D)

New York 
(24–17 Democratic)
 . Otis G. Pike (D)
 . James R. Grover Jr. (R)
 . Lester L. Wolff (D)
 . John W. Wydler (R)
 . Norman F. Lent (R)
 . Seymour Halpern (R)
 . Joseph P. Addabbo (D)
 . Benjamin Stanley Rosenthal (D)
 . James J. Delaney (D)
 . Emanuel Celler (D)
 . Frank J. Brasco (D)
 . Shirley Chisholm (D)
 . Bertram L. Podell (D)
 . John J. Rooney (D)
 . Hugh Carey (D)
 . John M. Murphy (D)
 . Ed Koch (D)
 . Charles Rangel (D)
 . Bella Abzug (D)
 . William Fitts Ryan (D), until September 17, 1972
 . James H. Scheuer (D)
 . Herman Badillo (D)
 . Jonathan Brewster Bingham (D)
 . Mario Biaggi (D)
 . Peter A. Peyser (R)
 . Ogden Reid (R)
 . John G. Dow (D)
 . Hamilton Fish IV (R)
 . Samuel S. Stratton (D)
 . Carleton J. King (R)
 . Robert C. McEwen (R)
 . Alexander Pirnie (R)
 . Howard W. Robison (R)
 . John H. Terry (R)
 . James M. Hanley (D)
 . Frank Horton (R)
 . Barber Conable (R)
 . James F. Hastings (R)
 . Jack Kemp (R)
 . Henry P. Smith III (R)
 . Thaddeus J. Dulski (D)

North Carolina 
(7–4 Democratic)
 . Walter B. Jones Sr. (D)
 . Lawrence H. Fountain (D)
 . David N. Henderson (D)
 . Nick Galifianakis (D)
 . Wilmer Mizell (R)
 . L. Richardson Preyer (D)
 . Alton Lennon (D)
 . Earl B. Ruth (R)
 . Charles R. Jonas (R)
 . Jim Broyhill (R)
 . Roy A. Taylor (D)

North Dakota 
(1–1 split)
 . Mark Andrews (R)
 . Arthur A. Link (D-NPL)

Ohio 
(17–7 Republican)
 . William J. Keating (R)
 . Donald D. Clancy (R)
 . Charles W. Whalen Jr. (R)
 . William Moore McCulloch (R)
 . Del Latta (R)
 . Bill Harsha (R)
 . Bud Brown (R)
 . Jackson Edward Betts (R)
 . Thomas L. Ashley (D)
 . Clarence E. Miller (R)
 . J. William Stanton (R)
 . Samuel L. Devine (R)
 . Charles Adams Mosher (R)
 . John F. Seiberling (D)
 . Chalmers Wylie (R)
 . Frank T. Bow (R), until November 13, 1972
 . John M. Ashbrook (R)
 . Wayne Hays (D)
 . Charles J. Carney (D)
 . James V. Stanton (D)
 . Louis Stokes (D)
 . Charles Vanik (D)
 . William Edwin Minshall Jr. (R)
 . Walter E. Powell (R)

Oklahoma 
(4–2 Democratic)
 . Page Belcher (R)
 . Ed Edmondson (D)
 . Carl Albert (D)
 . Tom Steed (D)
 . John Jarman (D)
 . John Newbold Camp (R)

Oregon 
(2–2 split)
 . Wendell Wyatt (R)
 . Al Ullman (D)
 . Edith Green (D)
 . John R. Dellenback (R)

Pennsylvania 
(14–13 Democratic)
 . William A. Barrett (D)
 . Robert N. C. Nix Sr. (D)
 . James A. Byrne (D)
 . Joshua Eilberg (D)
 . William J. Green III (D)
 . Gus Yatron (D)
 . Lawrence G. Williams (R)
 . Edward G. Biester Jr. (R)
 . John H. Ware III (R)
 . Joseph M. McDade (R)
 . Dan Flood (D)
 . J. Irving Whalley (R)
 . Lawrence Coughlin (R)
 . William S. Moorhead (D)
 . Fred B. Rooney (D)
 . Edwin Duing Eshleman (R)
 . Herman T. Schneebeli (R)
 . Robert J. Corbett (R), until April 25, 1971
 John Heinz (R), from November 2, 1971
 . George Atlee Goodling (R)
 . Joseph M. Gaydos (D)
 . John Herman Dent (D)
 . John P. Saylor (R)
 . Albert W. Johnson (R)
 . Joseph P. Vigorito (D)
 . Frank M. Clark (D)
 . Thomas E. Morgan (D)
 . James G. Fulton (R), until October 6, 1971
 William Sheldrick Conover (R), from April 25, 1972

Rhode Island 
(2 Democrats)
 . Fernand St. Germain (D)
 . Robert Tiernan (D)

South Carolina 
(5–1 Democratic)
 . Mendel Jackson Davis (D), from April 27, 1971
 . Floyd Spence (R)
 . William Jennings Bryan Dorn (D)
 . James Mann (D)
 . Thomas S. Gettys (D)
 . John L. McMillan (D)

South Dakota 
(2 Democrats)
 . Frank E. Denholm (D)
 . James Abourezk (D)

Tennessee 
(5–4 Democratic)
 . Jimmy Quillen (R)
 . John Duncan Sr. (R)
 . LaMar Baker (R)
 . Joe L. Evins (D)
 . Richard Fulton (D)
 . William Anderson (D)
 . Ray Blanton (D)
 . Ed Jones (D)
 . Dan Kuykendall (R)

Texas 
(20–3 Democratic)
 . Wright Patman (D)
 . John Dowdy (D)
 . James M. Collins (R)
 . Ray Roberts (D)
 . Earle Cabell (D)
 . Olin E. Teague (D)
 . Bill Archer (R)
 . Robert C. Eckhardt (D)
 . Jack Brooks (D)
 . J. J. Pickle (D)
 . William R. Poage (D)
 . Jim Wright (D)
 . Graham B. Purcell Jr. (D)
 . John Andrew Young (D)
 . Kika de la Garza (D)
 . Richard Crawford White (D)
 . Omar Burleson (D)
 . Bob Price (R)
 . George H. Mahon (D)
 . Henry B. González (D)
 . O. C. Fisher (D)
 . Robert R. Casey (D)
 . Abraham Kazen (D)

Utah 
(1–1 split)
 . K. Gunn McKay (D)
 . Sherman P. Lloyd (R)

Vermont 
(1 Republican)
 . Robert Stafford (R), until September 16, 1971
 Richard W. Mallary (R), from January 7, 1972

Virginia 
(6–4 Republican)
 . Thomas N. Downing (D)
 . G. William Whitehurst (R)
 . David E. Satterfield III (D)
 . Watkins Moorman Abbitt (D)
 . Dan Daniel (D)
 . Richard Harding Poff (R), until August 29, 1972
 M. Caldwell Butler (R), from November 7, 1972
 . J. Kenneth Robinson (R)
 . William L. Scott (R)
 . William C. Wampler (R)
 . Joel Broyhill (R)

Washington 
(6–1 Democratic)
 . Thomas Pelly (R)
 . Lloyd Meeds (D)
 . Julia Butler Hansen (D)
 . Mike McCormack (D)
 . Tom Foley (D)
 . Floyd Hicks (D)
 . Brock Adams (D)

West Virginia 
(5 Democrats)
 . Bob Mollohan (D)
 . Harley Orrin Staggers (D)
 . John M. Slack Jr. (D)
 . Ken Hechler (D)
 . James Kee (D)

Wisconsin 
(5–5 split)
 . Les Aspin (D)
 . Robert Kastenmeier (D)
 . Vernon Wallace Thomson (R)
 . Clement J. Zablocki (D)
 . Henry S. Reuss (D)
 . William A. Steiger (R)
 . Dave Obey (D)
 . John W. Byrnes (R)
 . Glenn Robert Davis (R)
 . Alvin O'Konski (R)

Wyoming 
(1 Democrat)
 . Teno Roncalio (D)

Non-voting members 
(2 Democrats)
 . Walter Fauntroy (D), from March 23, 1971
 . Jorge Luis Córdova (Resident Commissioner) (PNP)

Changes in membership
The count below reflects changes from the beginning of the first session of this Congress.

Senate 
 Replacements: 5
 Democratic: no net change
 Republican: no net change
 Deaths: 3
 Resignations: 0
Total seats with changes: 3

|-
| Georgia(2)
|  | Richard Russell Jr. (D)
| style="font-size:80%" | Died January 21, 1971
|  | David H. Gambrell (D)
| February 1, 1971
|-
| Vermont(1)
|  | Winston L. Prouty (R)
| style="font-size:80%" | Died September 10, 1971
|  | Robert Stafford (R)
| September 16, 1971
|-
| Louisiana(2)
|  | Allen J. Ellender (D)
| style="font-size:80%" | Died July 27, 1972
|  | Elaine S. Edwards (D)
| August 1, 1972
|-
| Georgia(2)
|  | David H. Gambrell (D)
| style="font-size:80%" | Successor elected November 7, 1972
|  | Sam Nunn (D)
| November 8, 1972
|-
| Louisiana(2)
|  | Elaine S. Edwards (D)
| style="font-size:80%" | Successor elected November 13, 1972
|  | J. Bennett Johnston (D)
| November 14, 1972
|}

House of Representatives 
 Replacements: 10
 Democratic: no net loss
 Republican: no net gain
 Deaths: 8
 Resignations: 6
Total seats with changes: 16

|- 
| nowrap | 
| Vacant
| style="font-size:80%" | District elected first delegate since the seat was re-established during previous congress
|  | Walter Fauntroy (D)
| March 23, 1971
|- 
| nowrap | 
| Vacant
| style="font-size:80%" | Rep. L. Mendel Rivers died during previous congress
|  | Mendel Jackson Davis (D)
| April 27, 1971
|- 
| 
|  nowrap| Rogers Morton (R)
| style="font-size:80%" | Resigned January 29, 1971, after being appointed United States Secretary of the Interior
|  nowrap | William Oswald Mills (R)
| May 25, 1971
|- 
| 
|  nowrap| Robert J. Corbett (R)
| style="font-size:80%" | Died April 25, 1971
|  nowrap | John Heinz (R)
| November 2, 1971
|- 
| 
|  nowrap| Robert Stafford (R)
| style="font-size:80%" | Resigned after being appointed to the US Senate September 16, 1971
|  nowrap | Richard W. Mallary (R)
| January 7, 1972
|-
| 
|  | John C. Watts (D)
| style="font-size:80%" | Died September 24, 1971
|  | William P. Curlin Jr. (D)
| December 4, 1971
|- 
| 
|  nowrap| James G. Fulton (R)
| style="font-size:80%" | Died October 6, 1971
|  nowrap | William Sheldrick Conover (R)
| April 25, 1972
|- 
| 
|  nowrap| Charlotte Thompson Reid (R)
| style="font-size:80%" | Resigned October 7, 1971, after being appointed to the Federal Communications Commission
|  nowrap | Cliffard D. Carlson (R)
| April 4, 1972
|-
| 
|  | George W. Andrews (D)
| style="font-size:80%" | Died December 25, 1971
|  | Elizabeth B. Andrews (D)
| April 4, 1972
|-
| 
|  | F. Bradford Morse (R)
| style="font-size:80%" | Resigned May 1, 1972, after being appointed Undersecretary General for Political and General Assembly Affairs at the United Nations
| Vacant
| Not filled this congress
|-
| 
|  | Edwin Edwards (D)
| style="font-size:80%" | Resigned after being elected Governor of Louisiana May 9, 1972
|  | John Breaux (D)
| September 30, 1972
|- 
| 
|  | Richard Harding Poff (R)
| style="font-size:80%" | Resigned after being appointed as a judge of the Supreme Court of Virginia
|  | M. Caldwell Butler (R)
| November 7, 1972
|-
| 
|  | William Fitts Ryan (D)
| style="font-size:80%" | Died September 17, 1972.
| rowspan=4 |Vacant
| rowspan=4 |Not filled this congress
|-
| 
|  | Frank T. Bow (R)
| style="font-size:80%" | Died November 13, 1972.
|-
| 
|  | George W. Collins (D)
| style="font-size:80%" | Died in a plane crash December 8, 1972.
|-
| 
|  | Nick Begich (D)
| style="font-size:80%" | He and Hale Boggs were lost in a plane crash October 16, 1972.  Presumptive death certificate for Rep. Begich was issued December 29, 1972.
|}

Committees

Senate

 Aeronautical and Space Sciences (Chair: Clinton P. Anderson; Ranking Member: Carl T. Curtis)
 Agriculture and Forestry (Chair: Herman E. Talmadge; Ranking Member: Jack Miller) 
 Appropriations (Chair: Allen J. Ellender; Ranking Member: Milton R. Young)
 Armed Services (Chair: John C. Stennis; Ranking Member: Margaret Chase Smith)
 Banking, Housing and Currency (Chair: John J. Sparkman; Ranking Member: John G. Tower)
 Commerce (Chair: Warren G. Magnuson; Ranking Member: Norris Cotton)
 District of Columbia (Chair: Thomas F. Eagleton; Ranking Member: Charles Mathias)
 Equal Educational Opportunity (Select) (Chair: Walter Mondale)
 Finance (Chair: Russell B. Long; Ranking Member: Wallace F. Bennett)
 Foreign Relations (Chair: J. William Fulbright; Ranking Member: George D. Aiken) 
 Government Operations (Chair: John Little McClellan; Ranking Member: Karl E. Mundt)
 Interior and Insular Affairs (Chair: Henry M. Jackson; Ranking Member: Gordon Allott)
 Judiciary (Chair: James O. Eastland; Ranking Member: Roman L. Hruska)
 Labor and Public Welfare (Chair: Harrison A. Williams; Ranking Member: Jacob K. Javits)
 Nutrition and Human Needs (Select) (Chair: George McGovern)
 Post Office and Civil Services (Chair: Gale W. McGee; Ranking Member: Hiram L. Fong)
 Public Works (Chair: Jennings Randolph; Ranking Member: John Sherman Cooper)
 Rules and Administration (Chair: B. Everett Jordan; Ranking Member: Winston L. Prouty)
 Secret and Confidential Government Documents (Special)
 Small Business (Select) (Chair: Alan Bible)
 Standards and Conduct (Select) (Chair: John C. Stennis; Vice Chair: Wallace F. Bennett)
 Subcommittee on Veterans' Affairs (Chair: Vance Hartke; Ranking Member: Strom Thurmond)
 Whole

House of Representatives

 Agriculture (Chair: William R. Poage; Ranking Member: Page Belcher)
 Appropriations (Chair: George H. Mahon; Ranking Member: Frank T. Bow)
 Armed Services (Chair: F. Edward Hebert; Ranking Member: Leslie C. Arends)
 Banking and Currency (Chair: Wright Patman; Ranking Member: William B. Widnall)
 Crime (Select) (Chair: Claude Pepper)
 District of Columbia (Chair: John L. McMillan; Ranking Member: Ancher Nelsen)
 Education and Labor (Chair: Carl D. Perkins; Ranking Member: Al Quie)
 Foreign Affairs (Chair: Thomas E. Morgan; Ranking Member: William S. Mailliard)
 Government Operations (Chair: Chet Holifield; Ranking Member: Florence P. Dwyer)
 House Administration (Chair: Wayne L. Hays; Ranking Member: Samuel L. Devine)
 House Beauty Shop (Select) (Chair: Martha W. Griffiths)
 House Restaurant (Select) (Chair: John C. Kluczynski)
 Interior and Insular Affairs (Chair: Wayne N. Aspinall; Ranking Member: John P. Saylor)
 Internal Security (Chair: Richard H. Ichord; Ranking Member: John M. Ashbrook)
 Interstate and Foreign Commerce (Chair: Harley O. Staggers; Ranking Member: William L. Springer)
 Judiciary (Chair: Emanuel Celler; Ranking Member: William M. McCulloch)
 Merchant Marine and Fisheries (Chair: Emanuel Celler; Ranking Member: Thomas M. Pelly)
 Post Office and Civil Service (Chair: Edward A. Garmatz; Ranking Member: Robert J. Corbett)
 Public Works (Chair: John A. Blatnik; Ranking Member: Bill Harsha)
 Regulate Parking (Select) (Chair: B.F. Sisk)
 Rules (Chair: William M. Colmer; Ranking Member: H. Allen Smith)
 Science and Astronautics (Chair: George P. Miller; Ranking Member: James G. Fulton)
 Small Business (Select) (Chair: Joe L. Evins)
 Standards of Official Conduct (Chair: Charles Melvin Price; Ranking Member: Jackson E. Betts) 
 Veterans' Affairs (Chair: Olin E. Teague; Ranking Member: Charles M. Teague) 
 Ways and Means (Chair: Wilbur D. Mills; Ranking Member: John W. Byrnes)
 Whole

Joint committees

 Atomic Energy (Chair: Sen. John O. Pastore; Vice Chair: Rep. Charles Melvin Price)
 Congressional Operations (Chair: Rep. Jack Brooks; Vice Chair: Sen. Lee Metcalf)
 Defense Production (Chair: Rep. Wright Patman; Vice Chair: Sen. John J. Sparkman)
 Economic (Chair: Sen. William Proxmire; Vice Chair: Rep. Wright Patman)
 The Library (Chair: Rep. Wayne L. Hays; Vice Chair: Sen. B. Everett Jordan)
 Navajo-Hopi Indian Administration 
 Printing (Chair: N/A)
 Reduction of Nonessential Federal Expenditures (Chair: Rep. George H. Mahon) 
 Taxation (Chair: Rep. Wilbur D. Mills; Vice Chair: Sen. Russell B. Long)

Employees

Legislative branch agency directors 
 Architect of the Capitol: George M. White, appointed January 27, 1971
 Attending Physician of the United States Congress: Rufus Pearson 
 Comptroller General of the United States: Elmer B. Staats
 Librarian of Congress: Lawrence Quincy Mumford 
 Public Printer of the United States: Adolphus N. Spence, until 1972

Senate 
 Chaplain: Edward L.R. Elson (Presbyterian)
 Curator: James R. Ketchum
 Parliamentarian: Floyd Riddick
 Secretary: Francis R. Valeo
 Librarian: Richard D. Hupman
 Democratic Party Secretary: J. Stanley Kimmitt
 Republican Party Secretary: J. Mark Trice
 Sergeant at Arms: Robert G. Dunphy, until June 30, 1972 (resigned)
 William H. Wannall, from July 1, 1972

House of Representatives 
 Clerk: W. Pat Jennings
 Sergeant at Arms: Zeake W. Johnson Jr., January 21, 1971 – September 30, 1972 (resigned)
 Kenneth R. Harding, from October 1, 1972 
 Doorkeeper: William M. Miller
 Postmaster: H. H. Morris, January 21, 1971 – June 30, 1972 (resigned)
 Robert V. Rota, from July 1, 1972
 Parliamentarian: Lewis Deschler
 Reading Clerks: 
 Joe Bartlett (until 1971) (R), Bob Berry (starting 1971) (R)
 Charles W. Hackney Jr. (D)
 Chaplain: Edward G. Latch (Methodist)

Footnotes

See also
 1970 United States elections (elections leading to this Congress)
 1970 United States Senate elections
 1970 United States House of Representatives elections
 1972 United States elections (elections during this Congress, leading to the next Congress)
 1972 United States presidential election
 1972 United States Senate elections
 1972 United States House of Representatives elections

Notes

References
 Biographical Directory of the U.S. Congress
 U.S. House of Representatives: Congressional History
 U.S. Senate: Statistics and Lists

External links